Goddard Lieberson (April 5, 1911 – May 29, 1977) was the president of Columbia Records from 1956 to 1971, and again from 1973 to 1975. He became president of the Recording Industry Association of America in 1964. He was also a composer, and studied with George Frederick McKay, at the University of Washington, Seattle. He married Vera Zorina in 1946 and with her had 2 children.

Biography
Lieberson was born to a Jewish family on April 5, 1911, in Hanley in Staffordshire; his father was a manufacturer of rubber shoe heels who took his family to the United States when Lieberson was a child. He studied classical piano and composition at the Eastman School of Music in the 1930s and after graduating he wrote classical concert reviews under the pseudonym "Johann Sebastian". He was married to actress/dancer Vera Zorina from 1946 until his death in 1977. They had two sons: Peter Lieberson, a composer, and Jonathan Lieberson. Lieberson was noted for his personal elegance, taste and style, and was renowned as a wit, bon vivant and international traveller, whose circle of friends and acquaintances included Jacqueline Kennedy Onassis, Richard Rodgers, W. Somerset Maugham, Noël Coward and John Gielgud.

Lieberson began working for the CBS group of labels in 1938 – the same year the company was acquired by the CBS broadcasting empire – and he began his career at Columbia as an A&R Manager. Before becoming president of the company, Lieberson was responsible for Columbia's introduction of the long-playing record.  The LP was particularly well-suited to Columbia's long-established classical repertoire, as recorded by the Philadelphia Orchestra under Eugene Ormandy and the New York Philharmonic Orchestra conducted by Artur Rodziński, Dmitri Mitropoulos, and Leonard Bernstein. Lieberson was also a lifelong friend of musician, recording artist, TV personality and Columbia A&R manager/producer Mitch Miller, having met Miller when the two were studying music at the Eastman School of Music in the 1930s

He was promoted to president of Columbia Records from 1956 to 1971 and again from 1973 to 1975. In 1966, in a reorganization, Columbia Records became subsidiary to the newly formed CBS/Columbia Group. In 1967, Lieberson promoted Clive Davis to president of Columbia Records.

In 1977, Lieberson co-wrote and produced the CBS-TV special They Said it with Music: From Yankee Doodle to Ragtime, a salute to American songwriters throughout the ages, starring Bernadette Peters, Tony Randall, Jason Robards, Jean Stapleton and Flip Wilson, with appearances by Thurl Ravenscroft and Jimmy Griffin, a founding member of the soft-rock band Bread. The show aired July 4, thirty-seven days after Lieberson died of cancer in New York City on May 29, 1977, aged 66.

Lieberson was the grandfather of sisters Elizabeth (Lizzie), Katherine, and Kristina, who as of 2013 were members of the band TEEN.

Cast recordings
His greatest legacy, however, was probably the original cast recordings he produced. Columbia was not the first to offer such recordings; Musicraft's 1938 recording of The Cradle Will Rock was the first (not Decca's 1943 recording of Oklahoma! as is often erroneously stated). Lieberson's recordings at Columbia, however, were influential.

In addition to documenting the musical performances of the 1950s, 1960s, and 1970s, Lieberson also produced notable studio cast recordings of musicals of the 1930s and 1940s, such as Pal Joey and The Boys from Syracuse, for which cast albums had not been made.

Though vinyl fans might consider Lieberson's greatest legacy his being responsible for the introduction of the LP record, most observers consider his Broadway show production as his singular achievement.

Though other labels had issued Broadway shows on LP (Decca issued Guys and Dolls in 1950) Lieberson's extensive coverage of Broadway mainstreamed and popularized original cast recordings.

In fact, Lieberson provided the $375,000 needed to produce the stage production of My Fair Lady, considered to be among the greatest shows ever, in exchange for the rights to release on Columbia the original cast recording.

Both on stage and at the record store the investment paid off handsomely. The original cast recording (in mono only), starring Julie Andrews and Rex Harrison, topped the Billboard 200 charts for 15 weeks 1956—1959. A stereo recording produced in England with Andrews and Harrison was issued in 1959.

Positions

References

1911 births
1977 deaths
American music industry executives
American record producers
Jewish American musicians
Deaths from cancer in New York (state)
Grammy Award winners
People from Hanley, Staffordshire
Columbia Records
American male composers
British Jews
University of Washington School of Music alumni
British emigrants to the United States
20th-century American composers
20th-century American businesspeople
20th-century American male musicians
Eastman School of Music alumni
20th-century American Jews